Anthony Mark Thornton (born 27 March 1967) is a former field hockey player from New Zealand, who finished in eighth position with the Men's National Team, nicknamed Black Sticks, at the 1992 Summer Olympics in Barcelona, Spain. He was born in Wanganui.

He was later the head coach of the NSWIS (NSW Institute of Sport) women's hockey program.

References
 New Zealand Olympic Committee

External links
 

New Zealand male field hockey players
Field hockey players at the 1992 Summer Olympics
Olympic field hockey players of New Zealand
1967 births
Living people